Omar Dabaj (born 13 January 1969) is a Jordanian boxer. He competed in the men's middleweight event at the 1988 Summer Olympics.

References

1969 births
Living people
Jordanian male boxers
Olympic boxers of Jordan
Boxers at the 1988 Summer Olympics
Place of birth missing (living people)
Middleweight boxers